The 2022–23 Championnat National 2 is the 25th season of the fourth tier in the French football league system in its current format. This season the competition is contested by 64 clubs split geographically across four groups of 16 teams. The teams include amateur clubs (although a few are semi-professional) and the reserve teams of professional clubs. The competition started on 20 August 2022 and is scheduled to complete on 3 June 2023.

Teams
On 13 July 2022, the FFF ratified the constitution of the competition, and published the groups.

Changes from the 2021-22 season are:

Teams joining the division
 Chambly, Boulogne and Créteil finished in the relegation positions in 2021-22 Championnat National.
 Sète were relegated from 2021-22 Championnat National by the Direction Nationale du Contrôle de Gestion for financial mismanagement.
 Stade Bordelais, Saumur, Vierzon, Furiani-Agliani, Racing Besançon, Colmar, Alès, Wasquehal, Évreux, Rennes (res), Racing Club and Thonon Évian finished in the promotion places in 2021–22 Championnat National 3

Teams leaving the division
 Versailles, Martigues, Paris 13 Atletico and Le Puy were champions of each group, and were promoted to 2022–23 Championnat National
 Plabennec, Vitré, Schiltigheim, Lens (res), Entente SSG, Monaco (res), Rumilly-Vallières, Marseille (res), Montpellier (res), Colomiers and Mont-de-Marsan finished in the relegation positions in 2021–22 Championnat National 2 and were relegated to 2022–23 Championnat National 3
 Béziers were relegated to 2022-23 Championnat National 3 by the DNCG for financial mismanagement.

Promotion and Relegation
The top team in each group will be promoted to 2023–24 Championnat National.

Due to the restructuring of the French football leagues, this season the bottom five teams in each group will be relegated to 2023–24 Championnat National 3, along with the two worst performing 11th-placed teams. This performance will be calculated based on the performance of each 11th-placed team in matches against the teams finishing 6th to 10th.

League tables

Group A

Group B

Group C

Group D

Top scorers

References

 2022–23
4
Fra